Ganai may refer to:
 Ganai people, an ethnic group of Australia
 Ganai language, an Australian language
 Ganai, Iran, a village

Language and nationality disambiguation pages